The Snoopy was a small human-powered non-rigid airship, designed and built by Tony Norton of Melbourne, Australia. It flew on 27 February 1976. The envelope was constructed using metallic 1 mil Mylar film.
  
Norton went on to develop the Mantainer Ardath airship.

Specifications

References

External links

Aircraft first flown in 1976
Human-powered aircraft
Airships of Australia
1970s Australian sport aircraft
1970s aircraft stubs